Vimochanam is a 1940 Indian Tamil-language film dealing with the issue of prohibition. Directed by T. Marconi, the film stars Hemalatha, Kanthamani, Baby Jaya, Indira and Bhagirathi. Released on 30 March 1940, it received a great deal of attention because of the values it propagated, and the fact that most of the artistes were girl children. No print or stills of this film are known to survive, making it a lost film.

Plot 
Arumugham, a drunkard living in Salem, sells his wife's jewellery to purchase alcohol until probation in Salem offers much-needed relief. He is soon arrested for illegally trying to brew liquor. After he is released, he finds the liquor shop has become a tea-stall and his wife destitute, leading to his reform.

Cast 
 Hemalatha
 Kanthamani
 Baby Jaya
 Indira
 Bhagirathi

Production 
Vimochanam was a pro-prohibition magazine published by politician C. Rajagopalachari from his Ashram at Tiruchengode. Inspired by Rajagopalachari's anti-alcohol crusade, a film sharing its name with the magazine, starring mainly girl children belonging to the Chennai Sirumigal Sangeetha Vidyasaalai, was launched. The film was written by short story writer Sasi while T. Marconi, an Italian who was then living in Madras, directed the film. Art direction was handled by D. S. Ghadgaonkar, and cinematography by T. P. Chauhan. The film was jointly produced by Jaya and Hindustan Films.

Soundtrack 
The soundtrack was composed by Ramani, the founder of the Ramani School of Music, while Sasi wrote the lyrics. The background score was composed by Sarma Brothers. The film had many songs performed by Carnatic musician Lalitha Venkataraman. Popular songs include "Kallai Ozhithida Sattamondru Chennai Congress Aatchiyil Seithanarey", "Mahaan Rajaji-yai Ellorum Vaazhthuvomey" and "Naattuomey Jayakodi". The songs were released by Odeon Records.

Release and reception 
Vimochanam was released on 30 March 1940. The Indian Express called it "a first-class story acting as excellent propaganda for prohibition." Film historian Randor Guy said the film received a great deal of attention because of the values it propagated, and the fact that most of the artistes were girl children. He said it would be remembered for its "meaningful lyrics, presentation and all roles being played by girl children." No print or stills of this film are known to survive, making it a lost film.

References

External links 
 
  - song paying tribute to Rajagopalachari and his services for the uplift of the poor sung by Bhagirathi and T. P. Sundari

1940 lost films
1940s Tamil-language films
1940 films
Films about alcoholism
Indian black-and-white films
Lost Indian films